The Wakal River is a tributary to the Sabarmati River in Rajasthan and Gujarat states of India.

Course
The river originates in the south-western spurs of the Aravalli range, and meets the Sabarmati River after traversing a distance of 158 kilometres. Mansi and Parvi are two main tributaries of the Wakal River.

Watershed
The area of the Wakal River's watershed is 1851 square kilometres, and is spread out over Udaipur district of Rajasthan and Sabarkantha district of Gujarat. 98% of the basin area lies in Rajasthan, the remainder in Gujarat.
The mean annual surface water yield for the basin is 319.4 million cubic metres.

There are 24 minor irrigation projects in the watershed, with a total live storage capacity of 65.98 million cubic metres. The Mansi Wakal Dam is the largest dam in the basin.

References

Rivers of Rajasthan
Rivers of Gujarat
Rivers of Uttar Pradesh
Rivers of India
Sabarmati River